Isaak Theodoridis (born 21 February 1968) is a Greek wrestler. He competed in the men's Greco-Roman 57 kg at the 1992 Summer Olympics.

References

1968 births
Living people
Greek male sport wrestlers
Olympic wrestlers of Greece
Wrestlers at the 1992 Summer Olympics
Sportspeople from Stuttgart